Experiment was built at Calcutta in 1800, and was lost in 1807. In between, she made one voyage for the British East India Company (EIC).

EIC voyage: Captain John Palmer left Calcutta on 24 August 1801, bound for England. Experiment was at Culpee on 29 September, reached Saint Helena on 4 January 1802, and arrived at Deptford on 27 March.
  
Fate: Experiment was listed in the 1807 volume of Lloyd's Register with Farmer, master, Gillet & Co. owner, and trade London—India. She was lost in 1807. She appeared for the last time in the 1808 volume of Lloyd's Register with unchanged information.

Citations

References
 
 
 

1800 ships
British ships built in India
Ships of the British East India Company
Age of Sail merchant ships
Merchant ships of the United Kingdom
Maritime incidents in 1807